Season eleven of Dancing with the Stars premiered on September 20, 2010, on the ABC network.

Several changes were introduced this season, including an "Acoustic Week," in which couples performed either the rumba or the Argentine tango while the audience was brought closer to the dance floor which was elevated and made circular. Contestants from previous seasons also came back as guest judges when the current contestants attempted re-created memorable routines in the 200th episode. These guest judges were Hélio Castroneves, Kelly Osbourne, Emmitt Smith, Drew Lachey, Gilles Marini, and Mel B. Kristi Yamaguchi and Apolo Ohno also served as team captains for team dances. There was also a week dubbed "Instant Choreography," in which the couples practiced their routines for a week, but only received the music for their Latin dances 45 minutes before their live performances.

Actress Jennifer Grey and Derek Hough were crowned the champions, while actor Kyle Massey and Lacey Schwimmer finished second, and Bristol Palin and Mark Ballas finished third.

Cast

Couples
The cast was announced during the August 30 episode of Bachelor Pad during a live press conference that included a Q&A session with host Tom Bergeron and co-host Brooke Burke and the new cast. There were twelve celebrity cast members this season. The pairs were announced on September 1; however, Bristol Palin and Mark Ballas were announced as a couple the day before by way of a Good Morning America interview.

This was the first season to feature no new professional dancers, as each of the twelve pros had appeared on at least one previous season.

Future appearances
Bristol Palin returned for the All-Stars season, where she was again paired with Mark Ballas.

Host and judges
Tom Bergeron and Brooke Burke returned as co-hosts, while Carrie Ann Inaba, Bruno Tonioli, and Len Goodman returned as judges.

Scoring charts

Notes

 : Each couple each couple received two scores from the judges this week: one for technical and one for performance.
 : This was the lowest score of the week.
 : This was the highest score of the week.
 :  This couple finished in first place.
 :  This couple finished in second place.
 :  This couple finished in third place.
 :  This couple was eliminated.

Highest and lowest scoring performances 
The highest and lowest performances in each dance according to the judges' 30-point scale are as follows.

Couples' highest and lowest scoring dances
Scores are based upon a potential 30-point maximum.

Weekly scores
Individual judges' scores in the charts below (given in parentheses) are listed in this order from left to right: Carrie Ann Inaba, Len Goodman, Bruno Tonioli.

Week 1: First Dances
Couples are listed in the order they performed.

Week 2: Top 11
Couples are listed in the order they performed.

Week 3: Story Week 
Couples are listed in the order they performed.

Week 4: Acoustic Week
Couples are listed in the order they performed.

Week 5: TV Week
Couples are listed in the order they performed.

Week 6: Rock Week 
Couples are listed in the order they performed.

Week 7: 200th Episode Week 
Couples are listed in the order they performed.

Individual judges' scores in the chart below (given in parentheses) are listed in this order from left to right: Guest judge, Carrie Ann Inaba, Len Goodman, Bruno Tonioli

Week 8: Instant Choreography Week 
Couples are listed in the order they performed.

Week 9: Semifinals
Couples are listed in the order they performed.

Week 10: Finals
Couples are listed in the order they performed.

Night 1

Night 2

Dance chart 
The celebrities and professional partners danced one of these routines for each corresponding week:
 Week 1 (First Dances): One unlearned dance (cha-cha-cha or Viennese waltz)
 Week 2 (Top 11): One unlearned dance (jive or quickstep)
 Week 3 (Story Week): One unlearned dance (samba or waltz)
 Week 4 (Acoustic Week): One unlearned dance (Argentine tango or rumba)
 Week 5 (TV Week): One unlearned dance
 Week 6 (Rock Week): One unlearned dance (paso doble or tango) & rock and roll marathon 
 Week 7 (200th Episode Week): Team dances & one unlearned dance 
 Week 8 (Instant Choreography Week): One unlearned dance & instant dance 
 Week 9 (Semifinals): Two unlearned dances 
 Week 10 (Finals, Night 1): Judge's choice dance & freestyle
 Week 10 (Finals, Night 2): Favorite dance & cha-cha-cha relay

Notes

 :  This was the highest scoring dance of the week.
 :  This was the lowest scoring dance of the week.
 :  This couple danced, but received no scores.

Ratings

References

External links 

Dancing with the Stars (American TV series)
2010 American television seasons